The wilaya of El M'Ghair is an Algerian province created in 2019, previously, a delegated wilaya created in 2015. It is in the Algerian Sahara.

Geography 
The wilaya of El M'Ghair is in the Algerian Sahara; its area is 131,220 km²   .

It is delimited by:

 to the north by the Biskra Province;
 to the east by the El Oued Province and Touggourt Province;
 to the west by the Ouled Djellal Province;
 and to the south by the Ouargla Province and Touggourt Province.

History 
The wilaya of El M'Ghair was created on November 26, 2019 .

Previously, it was a delegated wilaya, created according to the law n° 15–140 of May 27, 2015, creating administrative districts in certain wilayas and fixing the specific rules related to them, as well as the list of municipalities that are attached to it. Before 2019, it was attached to the El Oued Province.

Organization of the wilaya 
During the administrative breakdown of 2015, the delegated wilaya of El M'Ghair is made up of 3 communes and 2 Districts

List of walis 

El M'Ghair
Djamaâ

Notes and references

See also 

 History of Algerian local authorities

References

 
Provinces of Algeria
Sahara
States and territories established in 2019